Sherry's was a restaurant in New York City. It was established by Louis Sherry in 1880 at 38th Street and Sixth Avenue. In the 1890s, it moved to West 37th Street, near Fifth Avenue.
By 1898 it had moved to the corner of 44th Street and Fifth Avenue, before moving to the Hotel New Netherland on the corner of 59th Street in 1919.

History
Around 1880, with $1,300 saved from his time at the Hotel Elberon, Sherry launched his first restaurant in New York City at 38th Street and Sixth Avenue. The new establishment struggled a bit at first, but Sherry's knack for "dainty decorations" and the "novelties of service" won a following from "The Four Hundred" (late 19th century term for New York City's social elite, coined by Ward McAllister). In a short time, Sherry upgraded to a larger (and more prestigious) location at 37th Street and Fifth Avenue in 1890. But even that location proved too small, and again the business upgraded to a building owned by Isaac Vail Brokaw at 44th Street and Fifth Avenue in 1898.

The restaurant was the site for a dinner on horseback held by wealthy industrialist Cornelius Kingsley Garrison Billings, who had recently opened a private trotting stable at what is Fort Tryon Park today. Billings intended to have the dinner at the stables, but changed his mind and rented the main ballroom at Louis Sherry's instead.  On March 28, 1903, the horses were brought to the fourth floor of the Sherry building by freight elevator into a room fitted with a canvas backdrop to simulate an English country scene.  Billings invited 36 guests to dine with him on horseback.  Trays for the food were attached to the riding saddles and champagne was able to be sipped from a bottle in one's saddlebag via rubber tubing.  The horses were not Billings' own, but had been rented from local riding academies for the dinner; they were fed with troughs.

In 1919 it moved to Hotel New Netherland, on the corner of 59th Street.

References

Sources

 

Defunct restaurants in New York City